Fairmount Commercial Historic District is a national historic district located at Fairmount, Grant County, Indiana. It encompasses 31 contributing buildings in the central business district of Fairmount. It developed between about 1884 and 1945, and includes notable examples of Italianate and Romanesque Revival style architecture. Notable buildings include the Scott Opera House (1884), M.A. Hiatt Building (1900), Bogue Block (1889), J.W. Dale Block (1889), Fairmount Block (1901), Fairmount Public Library (1891-1893), Odd Fellow Block (1902), and Masonic Temple (1904).

It was listed on the National Register of Historic Places in 1999.

References

Historic districts on the National Register of Historic Places in Indiana
Romanesque Revival architecture in Indiana
Italianate architecture in Indiana
Historic districts in Grant County, Indiana
National Register of Historic Places in Grant County, Indiana